Guangnan County is located in Wenshan Zhuang and Miao Autonomous Prefecture, Yunnan province, China. The seat of Guangnan, known today as Liancheng, was the heart of the Gouding Kingdom that lasted approximately 400 years, from 111 BC to 316 AD.

Administrative divisions
In the present, Guangnan County has 7 towns and 11 townships. 
7 towns

11 townships

Climate
Guangnan, as with much of southern Yunnan, has a warm humid subtropical climate (Köppen Cwa), with muddled distinction between the seasons and daytime temperatures remaining warm year-round. May thru September accounts for nearly 75% of the annual rainfall of

Ethnic groups
The following information in this section is from the Guangnan County Gazetteer (2001).

Han
Zhuang
Miao
White Miao 白苗 (or Menglou 蒙娄)
Sinicized Miao 汉苗  Lopsided Miao 偏苗 (or Mengsha 蒙纱)
"Meng Zhua" (蒙爪)
Yao
Landian [Blue Indigo] Yao 蓝靛瑶 (or Jinmen 金门)
Daban [Large Board] Yao 大板瑶 (or Yu Mian 育棉)
Yi: split into two official divisions of Pu 仆 and Luo 倮. Autonyms are: Nisupo 尼苏颇, Guo 果, Poluo 颇罗 (exonym: Axi 阿细), Nishebei 尼舍杯, Nashepu 哪舍噗, Bugeng 布更, Gasou 嘎叟, Guwo 估涡, Mengpei 孟培, Mengpu 孟噗, Mengguobei 孟果杯, Lairen 徕人 (exonym: Laizi 徕子)
Pu 仆: Flowery Pula 花仆拉 (also called Pula 濮喇), White Pula 白仆拉, Black Pula 黑仆拉
Luo 倮: Flowery Luo 花倮, Black Luo 黑倮, Chinese Luo 汉倮, Sandaohong 三道红, Lairen 徕人
Gelao
Hui
Mongol

Ethnic Zhuang and Han make up about 80% of the county's population, with each group making up about 40%.

Miao
There were 81,223 ethnic Miao individuals comprising 16,086 households as of 1995.

White Miao 白苗: most of the county, including Nalun 那伦乡 and Diyu 底于乡
Sinicized Miao 汉苗: Heizhiguo 黑支果乡, Nanping 南屏镇, Babao 八宝镇
"Meng Zhua" (蒙爪): Yanshang of Heizhiguo 黑支果乡岩上, Dongguaping of Nanping 南屏镇冬瓜坪, Sala of Yangliujing 杨柳井洒啦

Yao
There were 14,707 ethnic Yao individuals comprising 2,673 households as of 1995.

Diyu Township (1,831 individuals, 323 households)
Babao Township (1,612 individuals, 281 households)
Zhetai Township (1,176 individuals, 175 households)
Jiumo Township (1,157 individuals, 226 households)
Yangliujing Township (1,092 individuals, 216 households)
Nasa Township (992 individuals, 188 households)
Heizhiguo Township (963 individuals, 165 households)

Yi
There were 35,879 ethnic Yi individuals comprising 7,001 households as of 1995, making up 5.21% of the county's total population.

Nisupo 尼苏颇: Longyang 龙秧, Zhetai 者太乡
Guo 果: Weinaji 未那基, Zhetai 者太乡
Guopo 果颇: Lao'an 老安, Zhetu 者兔乡
Poguo 颇果 (or Pula 仆拉): Anwang 安王, Nanping 南屏镇
Gasou 嘎叟: Anwang 安王, Nanping 南屏镇
Guwo 估涡: Mumei 木媄, Babao 八宝镇
Mengpei 孟培 (or Lairen 徕人): Wabiao 瓦标, Babao 八宝镇; Yilang 夷郎, Heizhiguo 黑支果乡
Meng 孟: Lisa 里洒, Babao 八宝镇
Mengpu 孟噗: Dagulu 大咕噜, Heizhiguo 黑支果乡
Bugeng 布更: Walong 挖聋, Nasa 那洒镇; Amiao 阿渺, Zhuanjiao 篆角乡
Nashepu 那舍噗: Changchong 长冲, Zhujie 珠街镇
Kashepu 卡舍噗: Tuanqing 团箐, Shuguang 曙光镇
Axi 阿细: Zhongzhai 中寨, Zhulin 珠琳镇

Gelao
There are 157 ethnic Gelao.
Baishiyan 白石岩, Laozhai 老寨村, Babao Township 八宝镇 (56 people)
Xijide 西基得村, Zhulin Township 珠琳镇 (50 people)
Muyang 木秧, Shujie 鼠街村, Heizhiguo Township 黑支果乡 (29 people)

Hui
There were 1,306 ethnic Hui individuals comprising 314 households as of 1995. Most lived in Zhulin Township, which had 964 ethnic Hui individuals comprising 212 households. Liancheng Township, the county seat, had 161 ethnic Hui individuals comprising 51 households.

Mongol
There are 497 ethnic Mongols.

Heizhiguo 黑支果村, Heizhiguo Township 黑支果乡 (132 people, 23 households)
Longtan 龙滩村, Heizhiguo Township 黑支果乡 (126 people, 25 households)
Shujie 鼠街村, Heizhiguo Township 黑支果乡 (24 people, 5 households)
Liancheng Township (75 people)
Zhuanjiao Township (65 people)
Shuguang Township (52 people)

Transport
Nearest airport: Wenshan Airport

Historical sites
Guangnan Minorities Museum: Featuring numerous neolithic and Bronze Age artifacts unearthed from tombs in the region, in addition to more modern Ming and Qing Dynasty objects (paintings, porcelain, wooden architectural features) collected from the town and nearby villages.
Grave of Princess Anhua (安化郡主). The 16-year-old princess, a full sister of the last (Southern) Ming emperor Zhu Youlang (the Yongli Emperor), died near Guangnan town in 1652, when the emperor was retreating from Guangxi to Yunnan.
Ayong Bridge: built on the outstrected branches of trees from the two banks of the river
Ayong ancestral home of the Nong clan
Guima Bridge: a traditional wind-and-rain bridge that is the center for folk singing and recreation
Guima Hall of the Elders
Wang Peilun's Residence: Xiban Village 夕板村, Guangnan
The Tinglang (rest kiosks) of Xiban Village 夕板村, Guangnan
The ganlan houses of Tuotong Village 拖同村 and Dixian Village 底仙村
Yanta Pagoda (a.k.a. Wenbi Pagoda): a 19th-century tower atop a prominent summit to the southeast of the city, offering excellent views of the surrounding region.

Historical villages include:
Heye 河野村
Tuopai 拖派村
Dixian 底仙村: notable for its unique ganlan houses found only there
Nabei 那贝村
Tuotong 拖同村
Gejia 革假村: notable for its thousand-year-old banyan tree, and for its many natives who passed the civil examination to become jinshi 进士 (palace candidates) during the Qing Dynasty
Ayong 阿用
Guima 贵马
Jiumo (旧莫) includes a former residence of a Nationalist warlord now defaced, poorly restored and in use as an agricultural store and communist memorial site, in addition to a covered bridge. Hard to reach and not set up for tourists, there is barely a restaurant.

References

Guangnan County Gazetteer 广南县志 (2001).
Johnson, Eric and Wang Mingfu (2008). "Zhuang cultural and linguistic heritage". SIL International and the Nationalities Publishing House of Yunnan.

External links

Guangnan County Official Website 

County-level divisions of Wenshan Prefecture